The 1999 Tournament of the Americas, later known as the FIBA Americas Championship and the FIBA AmeriCup (also known as Las Americas Tournament for Men, the FIBA Americas Olympic Qualifying Tournament, or Panamerican Olympic Qualifying Tournament for Men), was a basketball championship hosted by Puerto Rico, from July 14 to July 25, 1999. The games were played in San Juan, at the Roberto Clemente Coliseum. This FIBA AmeriCup was to earn the two berths allocated to the Americas for the 2000 Olympics, in Sydney, Australia. The United States won the tournament, the country's fourth AmeriCup championship.

Qualification 
Eight teams qualified during the qualification tournaments held in their respective zones in 1999; two teams (USA and Canada) qualified automatically since they are the only members of the North America zone.
 North America: , 
 Caribbean and Central America:, 

The draw split the tournament into two groups:

Group A

Group B

Format 
 The top four teams from each group advance to the quarterfinals.
 Results and standings among teams within the same group are carried over.
 The top four teams at the quarterfinals advance to the semifinals (1 vs. 4, 2 vs. 3).
 The winners in the knockout semifinals advance to the Final and were granted berths in the 2000 Summer Olympics tournament in Sydney. The losers figure in a third-place playoff.

Squads

Preliminary round

Group A 

|}

Group B 

|}

Quarterfinal group 

The top four teams in both Group A and Group B advanced to the quarterfinal group. Then each team played the four from the other group once to complete a full round robin. Records from the preliminary groups carried over.

|}

Knockout stage

Awards

Final standings

References

External links 
 FIBA Americas 1999 - Men Basketball, Latinbasket.com.
 1999 Panamerican Olympic Qualifying Tournament for Men, FIBA.com.

FIBA AmeriCup
1999 in Puerto Rican sports
International basketball competitions hosted by Puerto Rico
1999–2000 in North American basketball
1999–2000 in South American basketball
July 1999 sports events in North America